Dakota Valley Electric Cooperative is a public utility cooperative based in Milnor and Edgeley, North Dakota.  It serves as the electric distribution utility in a portion of southeast North Dakota.  It receives power from the Central Power Electric Cooperative.

Dakota Valley was formed by a merger of the former James Valley Electric Cooperative based in Edgeley and the former RSR Electric Cooperative based in Milnor.  In 2005, Dakota Valley entered into a resource-sharing agreement with its northern neighbor, Northern Plains Electric Cooperative, that allows it to function as one large cooperative while remaining two separate companies.

External links
Dakota Valley Electric Cooperative site

Electric cooperatives in North Dakota
Electric power companies of the United States